German submarine U-110 was a Type IXB U-boat of Nazi Germany's Kriegsmarine that operated during World War II. She was captured by the Royal Navy on 9 May 1941 and provided a number of secret cipher documents to the British. U-110s capture, later given the code name "Operation Primrose", was one of the biggest secrets of the war, remaining so for seven months. President Franklin D. Roosevelt was only told of the capture by Winston Churchill in January 1942.

Design
German Type IXB submarines were slightly larger than the original German Type IX submarines, later designated IXA. U-110 had a displacement of  when at the surface and  while submerged. She had two shafts and two  propellers.

U-110 was fitted with six  torpedo tubes (four fitted at the bow and two at the stern), 22 torpedoes, one  SK C/32 naval gun, 180 rounds, and a  SK C/30 as well as a  C/30 anti-aircraft gun. The boat had a complement of forty-eight.

Service history

U-110s keel was laid down 1 February 1940 by DeSchiMAG AG Weser, of Bremen, Germany as yard number 973. She was launched on 25 August 1940 and commissioned on 21 November with Kapitänleutnant Fritz-Julius Lemp in command.

The boat was part of the 2nd U-boat Flotilla from her commissioning date until her loss. Lemp commanded U-110 for her entire career. In an earlier boat, he was responsible for the sinking of the passenger liner SS Athenia on the first day of the war. The circumstances were such that he was considered for court-martial. He continued, however, to be one of the most successful and rebellious commanders of his day.

Operational career

First patrol
U-110 set out on her first patrol from Kiel on 9 March 1941. Her route to the Atlantic Ocean took her through the gap between the Faroe and Shetland Islands. Her first victim was Erodona which she damaged south of Iceland on 16 March. She also damaged Siremalm on the 23rd. This ship only escaped after she was hit by a torpedo which failed to detonate, (although it left a large dent) and the U-boat's 105mm deck gun crew forgot to remove the tampion in the muzzle before engaging their target. The resulting explosion on firing the first round wounded three men and compelled the boat to fire on the merchantman with the smaller 37 and 20 mm armament. Despite being hit, Siremalm successfully fled the scene, zig-zagging as she went.

U-110 arrived in Lorient on the French Atlantic coast on 29 March, having cut the patrol short due to damage from the exploding gun.

Second patrol and capture
The boat departed Lorient on 15 April 1941.

Her next quarry were the ships of convoy OB 318 east of Cape Farewell (Greenland). She successfully attacked and sank Esmond and Bengore Head, but the escort vessels responded. The British corvette, located the U-boat with ASDIC (sonar). Aubrietia and British destroyer  then proceeded to drop depth charges, forcing U-110 to surface.

Operation Primrose (9 May 1941)

U-110 survived the attack, but was seriously damaged.  and Broadway remained in contact after Aubrietias last attack. Broadway shaped course to ram, but fired two depth charges beneath the U-boat instead, in an endeavour to make the crew abandon ship before scuttling her. Lemp announced "Last stop, everybody out", meaning "Abandon ship". As the crew turned out onto the U-boat's deck they came under fire from Bulldog and Broadway with casualties from gunfire and drowning. The British had believed that the German deck gun was to be used and ceased fire when they realised that the U-boat was being abandoned and the crew wanted to surrender.

Lemp realised that U-110 was not sinking and attempted to swim back to it to destroy the secret material, and was never seen again. A German eyewitness testified that he was shot in the water by a British sailor, but his fate is not confirmed. Including Lemp, 15 men were killed in the action, and 32 were captured. Radio Officer Georg Högel and the rest of the crew were held at Camp 23 (Monteith POW camp at Iroquois Falls, Northern Ontario, Canada), which is now the Monteith Correctional Complex.

Bulldogs boarding party, led by Sub-Lieutenant David Balme, got onto U-110 and stripped it of everything portable, including her Kurzsignale code book and Enigma machine. William Stewart Pollock, a former radio operator in the Royal Navy and on loan to Bulldog, was on the second boat to board U-110. He retrieved the Enigma machine and books as they looked out of place in the radio room. U-110 was taken in tow back toward Britain, but sank en route to Iceland.

The documents captured from U-110 helped Bletchley Park codebreakers solve Reservehandverfahren, a reserve German hand cipher.

Wolfpacks
U-110 took part in one wolfpack, namely:
 West (9 May 1941)

Modern-day connections
The 2000 film U-571 was partially inspired by the capture of U-110.

In 2007, the submarine's chronometer was featured on the BBC programme Antiques Roadshow, from Alnwick Castle, in the possession of the grandson of the captain of the ship which captured her.

Summary of raiding history

See also
 U-571, a film inspired by the capture of U-110, erroneously claimed that the Enigma machine was seized by American submariners instead of the Royal Navy.
 Monteith POW camp (Camp 23)

Other captured U-boats
 
 U-570, later

References

Bibliography

 Hugh Sebag-Montefiore, Enigma: The Battle for the Code, 2000, .

External links
Enigma and Operation Primrose 

1940 ships
Captured U-boats
Enigma machine
German Type IX submarines
Maritime incidents in May 1941
Naval ships of Germany captured by the United Kingdom during World War II
Ships built in Bremen (state)
U-boats commissioned in 1940
World War II shipwrecks in the Atlantic Ocean
World War II submarines of Germany